Kingston was a railway station on the Ballarat to Daylesford railway line in Victoria, Australia.  

In the late 1970s many of the obsolescent Tait carriages were taken from Melbourne to Kingston and disposed of by being set on fire. The line closed shortly afterwards.

References

Disused railway stations in Victoria (Australia)